Chukhung is  a lodge village serving trekkers and climbers in the Khumbu region of Nepal in the Himalayas south of Mount Everest.

The Chukhung Valley lies on the southern slopes of Lhotse and Nuptse by the Lho Glacier and the Nup Glacier, the western slopes of Cho Polu and Baruntse by the Imja Glaciers, and the northern slopes of Mount Ama Dablam by the Ama Dablam Glacier and Chukhung Glacier.  It extends westward past the village of Dingboche where it joins the Pheriche Valley. The Imja Khola flows through the Chukhung Valley.

Chukhung village, is on a left fork of the Imja Khola. Administratively it is in the Solukhumbu District of Province No. 1. This area was traditionally used as a yak pasture with no permanent habitation. As Imja Tse has gained popularity as a trekking peak and the Chukhung Valley is a good acclimatization side trip for Everest Base Camp trekkers, several lodges have been built there.

Notes and references

Populated places in Solukhumbu District